Beta thymosins are a family of proteins which have in common a sequence of about 40 amino acids similar to the small protein thymosin β4.  They are found almost exclusively in multicellular animals. Thymosin  β4 was originally obtained from the thymus  in company with several other  small proteins which although named collectively  "thymosins" are now known to be structurally and genetically unrelated and present in many different animal tissues.

Single domain β-thymosins

Distribution 

Monomeric β-thymosins, i.e. those of molecular weight similar to the peptides originally isolated from thymus by Goldstein, are found almost exclusively in cells of multicellular animals.  Known exceptions are monomeric thymosins found in a few single-celled organisms, significantly those currently  regarded as  the closest  relatives of multicellular animals: choanoflagellates  and filastereans. Although found  in very early-diverged animals such as sponges, monomeric thymosins  are absent from arthropods and nematodes, which do nevertheless possess  "β-thymosin repeat proteins" which are constructed from several end-to-end repeats of  β-thymosin sequences.  Genomics has shown that tetrapods (land vertebrates) each express three monomeric β-thymosins, which are the animal species' equivalents (orthologues) of human β4, β10 and β15 thymosins, respectively. The human thymosins are encoded by the genes TMSB4X, TMSB10 and TMSB15A and TMSB15B. (In humans, the proteins encoded by the two TMSB15 genes are identical.)  Bony fish in general express orthologues of these same three, plus an additional copy of the β4 orthologue.

Thymosin β1 was found to be ubiquitin (truncated by two C-terminal glycine residues).

Relation to the WH2 sequence module 

The N-terminal half of β-thymosins bears a strong similarity in amino acid sequence to a very widely distributed sequence module, the WH2 module. (Wasp Homology Domain 2 - the name is derived from Wiskott-Aldrich syndrome protein). Evidence from X-ray crystallography shows that this part of β-thymosins binds to actin in a near-identical manner to that of WH2 modules, both adopting as they bind, a conformation which has been referred to as the  β-thymosin/WH2 fold.  β-thymosins may therefore have evolved by addition of novel C-terminal sequence to an ancestral WH2 module. However, sequence similarity searches designed to identify present-day WH2 domains fail to recognise β-thymosins, (and vice versa) and the sequence and functional similarities may result from  convergent evolution.

Biological activities of thymosin β4

The archetypical β-thymosin is  β4 (product in humans of the TMSB4X gene), which is a major cellular constituent in many tissues. Its intracellular concentration may reach as high as 0.5 mM. Following Thymosin α1,  β4  was the second of the biologically active peptides from Thymosin Fraction 5 to be completely sequenced and synthesized.

Due to its profusion in the cytosol and its ability to bind G-actin but not F-actin, thymosin β4 is regarded as the principal actin-sequestering protein in many cell types.

Clinical applications 

Thymosin β4 has been tested in multicenter trials sponsored jointly by RegeneRx Biopharmaceuticals Inc (Rockville, MD, USA) and Sigma Tau (Pomezia, Italy) in the United States and Europe in patients with bed sores, ulcers caused by venostasis, and Epidermolysis bullosa simplex and was found to accelerate bed sore and stasis ulcer repair by one month. 
It has also been tested in patients with chronic neurotrophic corneal epithelial defects and found to promote repair.

Thymosin β15 : Levels of human thymosin β15 in urine have shown promise as a diagnostic marker for prostate cancer which is sensitive to potential aggressiveness of the tumour

Doping in sports
Thymosin beta-4 was allegedly used by some players in various Australian football codes.

β-thymosin repeat proteins

Distribution 
These proteins, which typically contain 2-4 repeats of the  β-thymosin sequence, are  found in all phyla of the animal kingdom, with the probable exception of sponges The sole mammalian example, a dimer in mice, is synthesised by transcriptional read-through between two copies of the mouse  β15 gene, each of which is also transcribed separately. A uniquely multiple example is the protein thypedin of Hydra which has 27 repeats of a  β-thymosin sequence.

Biological activities 
β-thymosin repeat proteins resemble the monomeric forms in being able to bind to actin, but sequence differences in one example studied, a  three-repeat protein Ciboulot of the fruit fly Drosophila, allow binding to ends of actin filaments, an activity which differs from monomer sequestration.

These proteins became of interest in neurobiology with the finding that in the nudibranch (sea slug) Hermissenda crassicornis, the protein Csp24 (conditioned stimulus pathway phosphoprotein-24), with 4 repeats, is involved  in simple forms of learning: both one-trial enhancement of the excitability of sensory neurons in the conditioned stimulus pathway, and in multi-trial Pavlovian conditioning. The phosphorylation of Csp24, in common with post-translational modifications of a number of cytoskeleton-related proteins may contribute to actin-filament dynamics underlying structural remodeling of responsive cells.

See also 
 Thymosins
 Thymosin α1
 Thymosin beta-4

References 

Hormones of the thymus gland